Robert Alexander Crickett was one of the two MPs for Ipswich in the English parliament from 1807 to 1820.  He was a Tory.

References

Crickett
Tory MPs (pre-1834)